2/7 may refer to:
February 7 (month-day date notation)
July 2 (day-month date notation)
2nd Battalion, 7th Marines, a light infantry battalion of the United States Marine Corps 	
2/7 (number), a fraction